Samsung Ch@t 335 is a QWERTY phone made by Samsung Electronics. It was first announced in November 2010, then it was released a month after. The main features of the phone are its physical QWERTY keyboard, an optical trackpad, and Wi-Fi (802.11b/g). The phone's screen has a 320×240 px resolution. Other hardware features are Bluetooth 2.1 with A2DP, and an FM radio with RDS support. The device also supports Java applications.

See also
Samsung Galaxy Chat
Samsung Group

References

Chat 335
Mobile phones introduced in 2010